Fincantieri S.p.A. is an Italian shipbuilding company based in Trieste, Italy. Already the largest shipbuilder in Europe, after the acquisition of Vard in 2013, Fincantieri group doubled in size to become the fourth largest in the world (2014). The company builds both commercial and military vessels.

The company is listed on the Borsa Italiana (Milan Stock Exchange) and is a component of FTSE Italia Mid Cap Index.

Overview

Fincantieri designs and builds merchant vessels, passenger ships, offshore, and naval vessels, and is also active in the conversion and ship repair sectors. The company also owned Grandi Motori Trieste, which constructed marine diesel engines, but this was sold to Wärtsilä in 1999.

Founded in 1959 as Società Finanziaria Cantieri Navali – Fincantieri S.p.A. as a State financial holding company, part of IRI, the company became a separate entity in 1984.

Fincantieri employs a staff of about 10,000 workers at eight shipyards, two design centres, one research centre and two production sites for mechanical components. Another 10,000 people contribute to its supply chains.

The shipyards of Monfalcone (Gorizia), Marghera (Venice), Sestri Ponente (Genoa), Ancona, Castellammare di Stabia (Naples) and Palermo report to the Merchant Ships Business Unit while the shipyards of Riva Trigoso (Genoa) and Muggiano (La Spezia) report to the Naval Vessel Business Unit.

Fincantieri successfully completed the acquisition of Manitowoc Marine Group from its parent company The Manitowoc Company, Inc. on 1 January 2009, which consisted of two shipyards in Wisconsin, including Marinette Marine, which built the first . Fincantieri also purchased from Manitowoc Marine Group a topside repair yard in Ohio and one production plant in Wisconsin, making it one of the leading mid-sized shipbuilders in the United States for commercial and government customers, including the U.S. Navy and U.S. Coast Guard.

Already the largest shipbuilder in Europe, after the acquisition of Vard, formerly part of STX Europe, the Fincantieri group doubled in size to become the fourth largest in the world.

In March 2015, Fincantieri won its biggest ever independent order from Carnival Corporation & plc in a 4 billion euro deal commissioning the company to build five new cruise ships.

On 2 February 2018, Fincantieri announced an agreement for 50 percent of STX France valued at 59.7 million euro.

In March 2018, Fincantieri established Fincantieri Services USA – a subsidiary based in Miami, Florida, USA.

Ships built at Fincantieri (selection)

 1967 – , a cruiser, for the Italian Navy
 1983 – , an aircraft carrier, for the Italian Navy
 1990 – Pacific Jewel (69,845 GT) for P&O Cruises Australia
 1991 – Pacific Dawn  (70,285 GT) for P&O Cruises Australia
 1993 –  (55,451 GT) for Holland America Line
 1993 –  (55,575 GT) for Holland America Line
 1994 – MS Ryndam (55,819 GT) for Holland America Line
 1995 – Sun Princess (77,499 GT) for Princess Cruises
 1995 – Carnival Destiny (101,353 GT) for Carnival Cruise Lines
 1996 –  (57,092 GT) for Holland America Line
 1996 – Dawn Princess (77,499 GT) for Princess Cruises
 1997 –  (61,849 GT) for Holland America Line
 1998 – Sea Princess (77,499 GT) for Princess Cruises
 1998 – Disney Magic (83,000 GT) for Disney Cruise Line
 1999 –  (60,906 GT) for Holland America Line
 1999 – Carnival Triumph (101,509 GT) for Carnival Cruise Lines
 1999 – Disney Wonder (83,000 GT) for Disney Cruise Line
 2000 –  (61,396 GT) for Holland America Line
 2000 –  (62,735 GT) for Holland America Line
 2000 –  (77,499 GT) for P&O Cruises
 2000 – Carnival Victory (101,509 GT) for Carnival Cruise Lines
 2001 –  (81,769 GT) for Holland America Line
 2002 – Carnival Conquest (110,000 GT) for Carnival Cruise Lines
 2002 –  (82,000 GT) for Holland America Line
 2003 –  (3,371 GT) for Uksnoy & Co A/S
 2003 – Carnival Glory (110,000 GT) for Carnival Cruise Lines
 2003 – Costa Fortuna (102,587 GT) for Costa Crociere
 2003 – Costa Magica (102,587 GT) for Costa Crociere
 2004 –  (81,811 GT) for Holland America Line
 2004 – Carnival Valor (110,000 GT) for Carnival Cruise Lines
 2004 – , an aircraft carrier, for the Italian Navy
 2005 – , a destroyer, for the Italian Navy
 2005 – Costa Concordia (114,137 GT) for Costa Crociere
 2005 – Carnival Liberty (110,000 GT) for Carnival Cruise Lines
 2006 –  (82,500 GT) for Holland America Line
 2006 – Costa Serena (114,147 GT) for Costa Crociere
 2006 – Carnival Splendor (110,000 GT) for Carnival Cruise Lines
 2007 – , a destroyer, for the Italian Navy
 2007 –  (86,700 GT) for Holland America Line
 2007 –  (90,000 GT) for Cunard Line
 2007 – Carnival Freedom (110,000 GT) for Carnival Cruise Lines
 2007 –  (116,017 GT) for P&O Cruises
 2008 – Ruby Princess (113,000 GT) for Princess Cruises
 2008 – Costa Luminosa (92,700 GT) for Costa Crociere
 2008 – Costa Pacifica (114,500 GT) for Costa Crociere
 2009 – Carnival Dream (130,000 GT) for Carnival Cruise Lines
 2009 –  (86,700 GT) for Holland America Line
 2009 – Costa Deliziosa (92,700 GT) for Costa Crociere
 2009 –  (115,055 GT) for P&O Cruises
 2010 –  (90,901 GT) for Cunard Line
 2010 – Costa Favolosa (114,500 GT) for Costa Crociere
 2010 – Carnival Magic (130,000 GT) for Carnival Cruise Lines
 2011 – Costa Fascinosa (114,500 GT) for Costa Crociere
 2012 – Carnival Breeze (130,000 GT) for Carnival Cruise Lines
 2013 – MS Royal Princess (143,700 GT) for Princess Cruises
 2014 – MS Regal Princess (143,700 GT) for Princess Cruises
 2014 – Costa Diadema (132,500 GT) for Costa Crociere
 2014 – F.-A.-Gauthier (16,000 GT) for Société des traversiers du Québec
 2015 – MV Britannia (145,000 GT) for P&O Cruises
 2015 – Le Lyrial (10,944 GT) for Compagnie du Ponant
 2015 – MV Viking Star (47,800 GT) for Viking Ocean Cruises
 2016 – MV Seabourn Encore (40,350 GT) for Seabourn
 2016 – Seven Seas Explorer for Regent Seven Seas Cruises
 2016 – MV Viking Sea (47,800 GT) for Viking Ocean Cruises
 2016 –  (99,500 GT) for Holland America Line
 2016 – Carnival Vista (135,500 GT) for Carnival Cruise Lines
 2017 – MV Viking Sky (47,800 GT) for Viking Ocean Cruises
 2017 – Silver Muse (40,700 GT) for Silversea Cruises
 2017 – Majestic Princess (143,700 GT) for Princess Cruises
 2017 – MSC Seaside (153,516 GT) for MSC Cruises
 2017 – MV Viking Sun (47,800 GT) for Viking Ocean Cruises
 2018 – MV Seabourn Ovation (40,350 GT) for Seabourn
 2018 – MS Nieuw Statendam (99,500 GT) for Holland America Line
 2018 – Carnival Horizon (135,500 GT) for Carnival Cruise Lines
 2018 – MSC Seaview (153,516 GT) for MSC Cruises
 2018 – MV Viking Orion (47,800 GT) for Viking Ocean Cruises
 2019 – Sky Princess (143,700 GT) for Princess Cruises
 2019 – Costa Venezia (135,500 GT) for Costa Crociere
 2019 – MV Viking Jupiter (47,800 GT) for Viking Ocean Cruises
 2019 – Carnival Panorama (133,500 GT) for Carnival Cruise Line
 2020 – Costa Firenze (135,500 GT) for Costa Crociere
 2020 – Enchanted Princess (143.700 GT) for Princess Cruises
 2020 – Seven Seas Splendor for Regent Seven Seas Cruises
 2020 – Scarlet Lady (110,000 GT) for Virgin Voyages
 2021 – MV Viking Venus (47,800 GT) for Viking Ocean Cruises
 2021 – MSC Seashore (169,380 GT) for MSC Cruises
 2021 – Valiant Lady (110,000 GT) for Virgin Voyages
 2021 – Rotterdam  (99,500 GT) for Holland America Line
 2022 – Discovery Princess (143,700 GT) for Princess Cruises
 2022 – MV Viking Mars (47,800 GT) for Viking Ocean Cruises
 2022 – Resilient Lady (110,000 GT) for Virgin Voyages
 2022 – MS Queen Anne (113,300 GT) for Cunard Line
 2022 – MSC Seascape (169,380 GT) for MSC Cruises
 2022 – Norwegian Prima I (140,000 GT) for Norwegian Cruise Line
 2022 – MV Viking Neptune(47,800 GT) for Viking Ocean Cruises
 2023 – Norwegian Viva (140,000 GT) for Norwegian Cruise Line
 2023 – Explora I (64,000 GT) for MSC Cruises
 2023 – Project Virgin IV (110,000 GT) for Virgin Voyages
 2023 – Sunshine Princess I (175,000 GT) for Princess Cruises
 2024 – Explora 2 (64,000 GT) for MSC Cruises
 2024 – Project Leonardo III (140,000 GT) for Norwegian Cruise Line
 2025 – Explora 3 (64,000 GT) for MSC Cruises
 2025 – Sphere-class cruise ship II (175,000 GT) for Princess Cruises
 2025 – Project Leonardo IV (140,000 GT) for Norwegian Cruise Line
 2026 – Explora 4 (64,000 GT) for MSC Cruises
 2026 – Project Leonardo V (140,000 GT) for Norwegian Cruise Line
 2027 – Project Leonardo VI (140,000 GT) for Norwegian Cruise Line

List of shipyards

Cruise and ferry 
  Monfalcone shipyards (located at Monfalcone, Gorizia)
  Marghera shipyards (located at Marghera, Venice)
  Ancona shipyards (located at Ancona)
  Sestri Ponente shipyards (located at Genova)
  VARD Søviknes Shipyard
  VARD Braila shipyards
  VARD Tulcea shipyards

Military ships 
  Muggiano shipyards (located at La Spezia)
  Riva Trigoso shipyards (located at Sestri Levante, Genova)
  Castellammare di Stabia shipyards (located at Castellammare di Stabia, Napoli)
  Marinette Marine (located at Marinette, Wisconsin)

Offshore and specialty vessels 
  VARD Brattvåg shipyard
  VARD Langsten shipyards
  VARD Promar shipyard
  VARD Vung Tau shipyard

Service 
  Palermo shipyards (located at Palermo)
  Trieste shipyards (located at Trieste)
  Sturgeon Bay shipyard (located at Wisconsin)

See also

List of ships built by Fincantieri
Isotta Fraschini
Cantieri Riuniti dell'Adriatico

References

External links 

 

 
Shipbuilding companies of Italy
Conglomerate companies of Italy
Defence companies of Italy
Engineering companies of Italy
Italian boat builders
Shipyards of Italy
Multinational companies headquartered in Italy
Companies based in Trieste
Conglomerate companies established in 1959
Manufacturing companies established in 1959
Vehicle manufacturing companies established in 1959
Italian companies established in 1959
Government-owned companies of Italy
Partly privatized companies of Italy
Italian brands
Steam turbine manufacturers
Diesel engine manufacturers
Marine engine manufacturers
Electrical generation engine manufacturers
Locomotive engine manufacturers
Engine manufacturers of Italy